El Salvador competed at the 1992 Summer Olympics in Barcelona, Spain, from 25 July to 9 August 1992. This was the nation's fifth appearance at the Olympics.

Comité Olímpico de El Salvador sent a total of 4 athletes to the Games, 3 men and 1 women, to compete in 3 sports. This is the smallest-ever contingent of Salvadorian athletes at the Games. Swimmer María José Marenco was selected to carry her nation's flag during the opening ceremony.

Competitors 
Comité Olímpico de El Salvador selected a team of 4 athletes, 3 men and 1 women, to compete in 5 sports. Judoka Juan Vargas, at age 29, was the oldest athlete of the team, while swimmer María José Marenco was the youngest at age 15.

The following is the list of number of competitors participating in the Games.

Athletics

Men
Field events

Judo

Men

Swimming

Women

References
Official Olympic Reports

Nations at the 1992 Summer Olympics
1992
Olympics